The Lafayette class of submarine was an evolutionary development from the  of fleet ballistic missile submarine, slightly larger and generally improved. The James Madison and Benjamin Franklin classes are combined with the Lafayettes in some references.

Design
The first eight submarines initially deployed with the Polaris A-2 missile, later being refitted with the longer ranged Polaris A-3, with  having the A-3 missile from the start. In the mid-1970s all were upgraded to carry the Poseidon C3 missile; their missile tubes were slightly larger than the Ethan Allen and George Washington classes and Poseidon was designed to take advantage of this. Unlike twelve of the similar James Madison and Benjamin Franklin classes, none of the Lafayette-class submarines were refitted with Trident I (C4) missiles.

The Lafayettes and their successors were equipped with a hovering system to manage trim more effectively when firing missiles; this increased the missile rate of fire from one per minute to four per minute.

Daniel Webster was originally built with diving planes mounted on a "mini-sail" near the bow, leading to her nickname "Old Funny Fins". This configuration, unique to US submarines, was an attempt to reduce the effect of porpoising. While successful, the "mini-sail" required to contain the operating mechanism reduced hydrodynamic efficiency and lowered her overall speed. During a mid-1970s overhaul these unusual planes were removed and standard fairwater planes were installed. Here is a rare 1964 16mm Silent Film of USS Daniel Webster testing the unique "Funny Fins" diving planes off Cape Canaveral.

Fate
The Lafayettes were decommissioned between 1986 and 1992, due to a combination of SALT II treaty limitations as the  SSBNs entered service, age, and the collapse of the Soviet Union. One (Daniel Webster) remains out of commission but converted to a Moored Training Ship (MTS-626) with the missile compartment removed. She is stationed at Nuclear Power Training Unit Charleston, South Carolina, along with USS La Jolla (MTS-701) and USS San Francisco (MTS-711).

Boats in class
Submarines of the Lafayette class:

See also 

 41 for Freedom Fleet Ballistic Missile submarines
 Fleet Ballistic Missile
 List of submarines of the United States Navy
 List of submarine classes of the United States Navy

References 

Gardiner, Robert and Chumbley, Stephen (editors). Conway's All the World's Fighting Ships 1947–1995. Annapolis, USA: Naval Institute Press, 1995. .
Polmar, Norman. The Ships and Aircraft of the U.S. Fleet: Twelfth Edition. London:Arms and Armour Press, 1981. .
US Naval Vessel Register - List of SSBN BALLISTIC MISSILE SUBMARINE (NUCLEAR-POWERED) Class vessels

Submarine classes
 
 Lafayette class